Sodium lactate is the sodium salt of lactic acid, and has a mild saline taste. It is produced by fermentation of a sugar source, such as corn or beets, and then, by neutralizing the resulting lactic acid to create a compound having the formula NaC3H5O3.

Sodium lactate is used as a medication, and is included on the World Health Organization's List of Essential Medicines.

Uses

Food industry 
As a food additive, sodium lactate has the E number E325 and is naturally a liquid product, but also is available in powder form. It acts as a preservative, acidity regulator, and bulking agent.

Despite the similarity in name, sodium lactate itself is not chemically similar to lactose (milk sugar), so need not be restricted by those with lactose intolerance.

Cosmetics and personal care products 
Sodium lactate is sometimes used in shampoo products and other similar items such as liquid soaps, as it is an effective humectant and moisturizer.

Medical use 
Sodium lactate is used to treat arrhythmias caused by overdosing of class I antiarrythmics, as well as pressor sympathomimetics which can cause hypertension.

It can be given intravenously as a source of bicarbonate for preventing or controlling mild to moderate metabolic acidosis in patients with restricted oral intake (for sodium bicarbonate) whose oxidative processes are not seriously impaired. However, the use in lactic acidosis is contraindicated.

Sodium lactate may induce panic attacks in persons with existing panic disorder; up to 72% of individuals with panic disorder experience a panic attack when administered sodium lactate intravenously. Sodium lactate may therefore also be used to confirm a diagnosis of panic disorder.

Chemistry and biochemistry 
Sodium lactate is not chemically similar to lactose (milk sugar).

Production 
In general, lactates such as sodium, calcium, and potassium lactate are salts derived from the neutralization of lactic acid and most commercially used lactic acids are fermented from dairy-free products such as cornstarch, potatoes, or molasses. Sugar or tapioca additionally may be used.

In some rare instances, some lactic acid is fermented from dairy products such as whey and lactose. Whey is made of up 6.5% solids of which 4.8% is solid lactose. Waste whey is infrequently used to produce lactic acid when the whey itself is produced as waste during the manufacture of certain dairy products. Such dairy-type lactic acid generally goes back into dairy products, such as ice cream and cream cheese, rather than into non-dairy products. Moreover, although the lactic-acid starter culture to ferment corn or beets may contain milk, sodium lactate does not contain milk protein and need not be restricted by someone avoiding milk or those with a milk allergy.

References 

Anxiogenics
Food additives
Lactates
World Health Organization essential medicines
Organic sodium salts
E-number additives